Stylianos Devaris (1745 – 1813), also known as Defaris and  Kornaros respectively.  He was a Greek painter and goldsmith.  He was one of the prominent painters from the island of Lefkada.  He was a member of the Heptanese School.  The island featured many painters namely: Konstantinos Kontarinis, Spyridon Ventouras, Spyridon Maratzos, and Makarios Lefkas.  A notable theme popular on the island was John Chrysostom, Criticizing Empress Eudoxia.  Stylianos painted his own version of the theme.  Spyridon Ventouras and Makarios Lefkas also painted their versions.  Devaris mainly painted ecclesiastical themes.  According to the Institute of Neohellenic Research, over nineteen of his paintings have survived. His most notable work was John Chrysostom, Criticizing Empress Eudoxia.

History
Devaris was born on the island of Lefkada.  His father's name was Tzortzis.  The family was associated with the island of Kephalonia.  His brother was born there.  His name was Ioannis.  He was also a painter.  He was five years older than Stylianos.  They collaborated on several projects together in Lefkada.  The church archives in Lefkada contain a rich amount of information about the painter.  Stylianos also used the name Kornaros because his name was so popular on the island of Lefkada.   
Stylianos created small works and gilded the iconostasis of several churches.  

In 1778, the artist worked on the church of  Agia Paraskevi.  Two years later he worked on the church of Agioi Anargyroi of Lefkada.          
He also painted an icon for the church of Saint Mavra in 1783.  Saint Mavra was the patron saint of Lefkada.  He also painted icons for the church of the Holy Apostles (Agioi Apostoli) in Frini, Lefkada in 1793, 1794, and 1797.  In his final years, he worked on the iconostasis of the church Entrance of the Virgin in the city of Lefkada in 1813.  He died on the island that same year.

Gallery

See also
Efstathios Karousos
Jean-Paul Laurens

References

Bibliography

1745 births
1813 deaths
18th-century Greek people
18th-century Greek painters
19th-century Greek painters
19th-century Greek people
People from Lefkada
Painters of the Heptanese School